The Cooerwull railway footbridge is a heritage-listed pedestrian bridge located at Top Points Station, Zig Zag Railway, Lithgow, City of Lithgow, New South Wales, Australia. It was built in 1941. It was added to the New South Wales State Heritage Register on 2 April 1999.

History 
Originally constructed in 1941 as a low-cost temporary wartime railway footbridge for workers at the nearby Lithgow Small Arms Factory. After closure of the Small Arms Factory in 1974 the footbridge was retained for public use and then replaced by a steel and concrete structure in 1995.

The State Rail Authority recognised the heritage significance of the A-frame structure and placed it, in its complete form, adjacent to its original site. Subsequently in 2002 the Zig Zag Railway negotiated removal to the footbridge to Top Points Station for display, use and preservation.

Description 
A timber A-frame railway footbridge at the Top Points site, Zig Zag Railway; originally located over tracks at Cooerwull.

Heritage listing 
As at 16 March 2006, this is the only A-frame timber bridge built in the State, built to the simplest design with local materials. It was built in 1941 as a low-cost temporary wartime railway footbridge for workers at the nearby Small Arms Factory. In 2002 it was relocated to the Top Points site of the Zig Zag Railway.

The Cooerwull railway footbridge was listed on the New South Wales State Heritage Register on 2 April 1999 having satisfied the following criteria.

The place is important in demonstrating the course, or pattern, of cultural or natural history in New South Wales.

This item is historically rare as the only A-frame timber footbridge in New South Wales.

The place has a strong or special association with a person, or group of persons, of importance of cultural or natural history of New South Wales's history.

This item is associated with the Small Arms Factory, Lithgow for which it was purpose built.

The place is important in demonstrating aesthetic characteristics and/or a high degree of creative or technical achievement in New South Wales.

This item is assessed as architecturally rare.

The place has strong or special association with a particular community or cultural group in New South Wales for social, cultural or spiritual reasons.

The footbridge has some social significance to those people who worked at the nearby Small Arms Factory.

The place has potential to yield information that will contribute to an understanding of the cultural or natural history of New South Wales.

This item is assessed as scientifically rare.

The place possesses uncommon, rare or endangered aspects of the cultural or natural history of New South Wales.

This item is rare on a state-wide basis as the only A-frame timber bridge in New South Wales.

The place is important in demonstrating the principal characteristics of a class of cultural or natural places/environments in New South Wales.

This item is representative of many "temporary" or "for the duration of the war" structures that remain in New South Wales.

See also 

List of pedestrian bridges in Australia

References

Attribution

External links

New South Wales State Heritage Register
Lithgow, New South Wales
Pedestrian bridges in Australia
Articles incorporating text from the New South Wales State Heritage Register
Bridges completed in 1941
1941 establishments in Australia